Ghost Master (released as Ghost Master: The Gravenville Chronicles on the Xbox and PlayStation 2) is a puzzle strategy game developed by British studio Sick Puppies for Windows. The game was later published on Mac OS X by Feral Interactive. The player assumes the role of a Ghost Master, a bureaucratic spirit tasked to perform certain duties. While the bulk of a Ghost Master's duties consist of hauntings, a Ghost Master may also be "called in" to increase belief in the supernatural, avenge deaths, and conscript renegade ghosts. Because a Ghost Master cannot directly interfere in the world of mortals, the Ghost Master is given a team of subordinate ghosts to do so. When not haunting, the Ghost Master is responsible for the training of the ghosts under their command.

Gameplay
The game consists of 15 levels. In most levels, the primary goal is to scare all the mortals (humans) and cause them to flee the area in fear or succumb to madness.

Ghost Master plays similarly to a real-time strategy game. The player first chooses the ghosts to field in the level. The player cannot field every ghost in every place. Each ghost has one or two types of objects (or "fetters") it can be bound to. For example, a ghost who died during a robbery could only be bound to a "Murder Fetter," whereas a water spirit can only be bound to a bath, sink, or a simple puddle of water.

Another limiting factor is "Plasm". This numerical resource dictates which abilities a ghost can use. When a human becomes frightened, Plasm is generated. With more Plasm, stronger abilities (and more ghosts) can be fielded at any one time.

Once the objective(s) for a level has been completed, the game rates the player's performance. Many factors are considered, including time, amount of impact on the mortals, and how many mortals fled. If the player is able to complete the mission fairly quickly, there is a multiplier added to the final score. This score determines the amount of "Gold Plasm" given to the player, which is used to add more spells to ghosts' arsenals.

The game ends with a cliffhanger, with the Ghostbreakers bringing in a bomb that would completely erase supernatural presence in the city where the game takes place. Because of the lack of a sequel, a bonus level was released for fans, which provided some closure. However, the bonus level is only available for the UK version of the game and was not released for the retail US version.

Bonus content
The bonus level is included in the Steam and Good Old Games release of the game. The bonus level "Class of Spook'em high" is the only downloadable content released for the game. In the level, the Ghostbreakers attack the HQ of ghost master, an old, abandoned mansion where the player has to defeat the Ghostbreakers in order to win the game. The bonus content was released in place of a sequel.

Restless spirits
Each level also has "Restless Spirits," haunters bound to a certain location in some levels; usually, there is a backstory as to why they are there. The player can use the haunters on their team as well as the bound spirit to free them using a certain move or combination of moves. For example, in the first level the restless spirit Weatherwitch is bound to a vacuum cleaner that the player must destroy in order to free her.

Mortal defenses and abilities
All mortals have a belief level, which partially determines the effectiveness of a ghost's powers upon them. The belief bar is raised slightly with every scare, and particular powers are able to raise belief better than others. Every mortal also has conscious and subconscious fears which are linked to certain ghost's powers. Scaring a mortal with a power that targets their individual fear is particularly effective. These are usually unknown at the beginning of each level, but some ghosts have the ability to expose these fears.

Mortals also have a terror level and a madness level, with certain limits to each. When a human's terror bar is raised to a certain level, they flee; this is the objective of most of the in-game levels. The madness bar is filled only by the use of certain powers. When a mortal's madness bar reaches a certain point, they go insane, which is visible in that they now just roam the area of the scenario in a frenzy and are unable to be scared or maddened any more. The fear bar reduces as time progresses in the game, but the belief and madness bars do not.

Somewhere between average humans and ghosts are priests, witches, and mediums. These humans have the ability to banish ghosts that are fielded. Banished ghosts are no longer usable during that level, but are returned after the mission is complete. Also, a large score penalty is levied on players who allow ghosts to be banished.

Ghostbreakers are the most dangerous mortals, from a supernatural perspective. They are able to detect and banish ghosts at a much faster speed than the other "special" mortals mentioned previously. They are also able to field special wards, which prevent the player from fielding, or benching, ghosts trapped underneath them. Only if the electrical generators are destroyed do the wards fail.

Reception

The PC and PlayStation 2 versions received "generally favorable reviews", while the Xbox version received "mixed" reviews, according to the review aggregation website Metacritic.

GameSpot named Ghost Master the best computer game of August 2003. The staff of X-Play nominated Ghost Master for their 2003 "Best Strategy Game" award, which ultimately went to Rise of Nations.

See also
Dungeon Keeper and Dungeon Keeper 2, video games in which the player controls hellish creatures.
Evil Genius, a video game where the player controls an evil genius who is bent on world domination.
Haunting Starring Polterguy, a similar 1993 comedy-horror video game.

References

External links
 
 
 

2003 video games
Classic Mac OS games
Feral Interactive games
MacOS games
PlayStation 2 games
Puzzle video games
Strategy video games
Video games about ghosts
Video games about mental health
Windows games
Xbox games
Empire Interactive games
Video games developed in the United Kingdom